Irish, also known as Gaelic, is a Goidelic language of the Insular Celtic branch of the Celtic language family, which is a part of the Indo-European language family. Irish is indigenous to the island of Ireland and was the population's first language until the 19th century, when English gradually became dominant, particularly in the last decades of the century. Irish is still spoken as a first language in a small number of areas of certain counties such as Cork, Donegal, Galway, and Kerry, as well as smaller areas of counties Mayo, Meath, and Waterford. It is also spoken by a larger group of habitual but non-traditional speakers, mostly in urban areas where the majority are second-language speakers. The total number of persons (aged 3 and over) who claimed they could speak Irish in April 2016 was 1,761,420, representing 39.8% of respondents, but of these, 418,420 said they never spoke it, while a further 558,608 said they only spoke it within the education system. Linguistic analysis of Irish speakers is therefore based primarily on the number of daily users in Ireland outside the education system, which in 2016 was 20,586 in the Gaeltacht and 53,217 outside it, totalling 73,803. 

For most of recorded Irish history, Irish was the dominant language of the Irish people, who took it with them to other regions, such as Scotland and the Isle of Man, where Middle Irish gave rise to Scottish Gaelic and Manx. It was also, for a period, spoken widely across Canada, with an estimated 200,000–250,000 daily Canadian speakers of Irish in 1890. On the island of Newfoundland, a unique dialect of Irish developed before falling out of use in the early 20th century.

With a writing system, Ogham, dating back to at least the 4th century AD, which was gradually replaced by Latin script since the 5th century AD, Irish has the oldest vernacular literature in Western Europe. On the island, the language has three major dialects: Munster, Connacht and Ulster. All three have distinctions in their speech and orthography. There is also a "standard written form" devised by a parliamentary commission in the 1950s. The traditional Irish alphabet, a variant of the Latin alphabet with 18 letters, has been succeeded by the standard Latin alphabet (albeit with 7–8 letters used primarily in loanwords).

Irish has constitutional status as the national and first official language of the Republic of Ireland, and is also an official language of Northern Ireland and among the official languages of the European Union. The public body Foras na Gaeilge is responsible for the promotion of the language throughout the island. Irish has no regulatory body but the standard modern written form is guided by a parliamentary service and new vocabulary by a voluntary committee with university input.

Names

In Irish 
Goidelic, used to refer to the language family, is derived from the Old Irish term.

 also has a wider meaning, including the Gaelic of Scotland and the Isle of Man, as well as of Ireland.

In English 
In English (including Hiberno-English) the language is usually referred to as Irish, as well as Gaelic and Irish Gaelic. The term Irish Gaelic may be seen when English speakers discuss the relationship between the three Goidelic languages (Irish, Scottish Gaelic and Manx). Gaelic is a collective term for the Goidelic languages, and when the context is clear it may be used without qualification to refer to each language individually. When the context is specific but unclear, the term may be qualified, as Irish Gaelic, Scottish Gaelic or Manx Gaelic. Historically the name "Erse" was also sometimes used in Scots and then in English to refer to Irish; as well as Scottish Gaelic.

Goidelic is a synonym of Gaelic, used mainly in linguistic typology and historical linguistics. Goidelic and Brittonic together constitute the Insular Celtic languages.

History

Written Irish is first attested in  inscriptions from the 4th century AD, a stage of the language known as Primitive Irish. These writings have been found throughout Ireland and the west coast of Great Britain. Primitive Irish underwent a change into Old Irish through the 5th century. Old Irish, dating from the 6th century, used the Latin alphabet and is attested primarily in marginalia to Latin manuscripts.

By the 10th century, Old Irish had evolved into Middle Irish, which was spoken throughout Ireland, Isle of Man and parts of Scotland. It is the language of a large corpus of literature, including the Ulster Cycle. From the 12th century, Middle Irish began to evolve into modern Irish in Ireland, into Scottish Gaelic in Scotland, and into the Manx language in the Isle of Man.

Early Modern Irish, dating from the 13th century, was the basis of the literary language of both Ireland and Gaelic-speaking Scotland. Modern Irish, as attested in the work of such writers as Geoffrey Keating, may be said to date from the 17th century, and was the medium of popular literature from that time on.

From the 18th century on, the language lost ground in the east of the country. The reasons behind this shift were complex but came down to a number of factors:
 Discouragement of its use by the Anglo-Irish administration.
 The Catholic church's support of English over Irish.
 The spread of bilingualism from the 1750s onwards.

The change was characterised by diglossia (two languages being used by the same community in different social and economic situations) and transitional bilingualism (monoglot Irish-speaking grandparents with bilingual children and monoglot English-speaking grandchildren). By the mid-18th century, English was becoming a language of the Catholic middle class, the Catholic Church and public intellectuals, especially in the east of the country. Increasingly, as the value of English became apparent, parents sanctioned the prohibition of Irish in schools. Increasing interest in  emigrating to the United States and Canada was also a driver, as fluency in English allowed the new immigrants to get jobs in areas other than farming. An estimated one quarter to one third of immigrants during the Great Famine were Irish speakers.

Irish was not marginal to Ireland's modernisation in the 19th century, as is often assumed. In the first half of the century there were still around three million people for whom Irish was the primary language, and their numbers alone made them a cultural and social force. Irish speakers often insisted on using the language in law courts (even when they knew English), and Irish was also common in commercial transactions. The language was heavily implicated in the "devotional revolution" which marked the standardisation of Catholic religious practice and was also widely used in a political context. Down to the time of the Great Famine and even afterwards, the language was in use by all classes, Irish being an urban as well as a rural language.

This linguistic dynamism was reflected in the efforts of certain public intellectuals to counter the decline of the language. At the end of the 19th century, they launched the Gaelic revival in an attempt to encourage the learning and use of Irish, although few adult learners mastered the language. The vehicle of the revival was the Gaelic League, and particular emphasis was placed on the folk tradition, which in Irish is particularly rich. Efforts were also made to develop journalism and a modern literature.

Although it has been noted that the Catholic Church played a role in the decline of the Irish language before the Gaelic Revival, the Protestant Church of Ireland also made only minor efforts to encourage use of Irish in a religious context. An Irish translation of the Old Testament by Leinsterman , commissioned by Bishop Bedell, was published after 1685 along with a translation of the New Testament. Otherwise, Anglicisation was seen as synonymous with 'civilising' the native Irish. Currently, modern day Irish speakers in the church are pushing for language revival.

It has been estimated that there were around 800,000 monoglot Irish speakers in 1800, which dropped to 320,000 by the end of the famine, and under 17,000 by 1911. Seán Ó hEinirí, of Cill Ghallagáin, County Mayo, who died 26 July 1998, was possibly the last monolingual Irish speaker.

Status and policy

Ireland 
Irish is recognised by the Constitution of Ireland as the national and first official language of Ireland (English being the other official language). Despite this, almost all government business and legislative debate is conducted in English. 

The record of his delivering his inaugural Declaration of Office in Roscommon Irish is one of only a few recordings of that dialect.

In the 2016 census, 10.5% of respondents stated that they spoke Irish, either daily or weekly, while over 70,000 people (4.2%) speak it as a habitual daily means of communication.

From the foundation of the Irish Free State in 1922 (see History of the Republic of Ireland), new appointees to the Civil Service of the Republic of Ireland, including postal workers, tax collectors, agricultural inspectors, Garda Síochána (police), etc., were required to have some proficiency in Irish. By law, a Garda who was addressed in Irish he had to respond in Irish as well. 

In 1974, in part through the actions of protest organisations like the Language Freedom Movement, the requirement for entrance to the public service was changed to proficiency in just one official language. 

Nevertheless, Irish remains a required subject of study in all schools in the Republic that receive public money (see Education in the Republic of Ireland). Teachers in primary schools must also pass a compulsory examination called . As of 2005, Garda Síochána recruits need a pass in Leaving Certificate Irish or English, and receive lessons in Irish during their two years of training.

The National University of Ireland requires all students wishing to embark on a degree course in the NUI federal system to pass the subject of Irish in the Leaving Certificate or GCE/GCSE examinations. Exemptions are made from this requirement for students who were born or completed primary education outside of Ireland, and students diagnosed with dyslexia. 

NUI Galway is required to appoint people who are competent in the Irish language, as long as they are also competent in all other aspects of the vacancy to which they are appointed. This requirement is laid down by the University College Galway Act, 1929 (Section 3). In 2016, the university faced controversy when it announced the appointment of a president who did not speak Irish.  staged protests against this decision.  the following year three university announced that Ciarán Ó hÓgartaigh, a fluent Irish speaker, would be its 13th president.

For a number of years there has been vigorous debate in political, academic and other circles about the failure of most students in English-medium schools to achieve competence in Irish, even after fourteen years of teaching as one of the three main subjects. The concomitant decline in the number of traditional native speakers has also been a cause of great concern. 

In 2007, filmmaker Manchán Magan found few Irish speakers in Dublin, and faced incredulity when trying to get by speaking only Irish in Dublin. He was unable to accomplish some everyday tasks, as portrayed in his documentary No Béarla.

There is, however, a growing body of Irish speakers in urban areas, particularly in Dublin. Many have been educated in schools in which Irish is the language of instruction. These Irish-medium schools send a much higher proportion of pupils on to third-level education than do English-medium schools. In 2009, a paper suggested that within a generation, non-Gaeltacht habitual users of Irish might typically be members of an urban, middle class, and highly educated minority.

Parliamentary legislation is supposed to be available in both Irish and English but is frequently only available in English. This is notwithstanding that Article 25.4 of the Constitution of Ireland requires that an "official translation" of any law in one official language be provided immediately in the other official language, if not already passed in both official languages.

In November 2016, RTÉ reported that over 2.3 million people worldwide were learning Irish through the Duolingo app. Irish president Michael Higgins officially honoured several volunteer translators for developing the Irish edition, and said the push for Irish language rights remains an "unfinished project".

Gaeltacht 

There are rural areas of Ireland where Irish is still spoken daily to some extent as a first language. These regions are known individually and collectively as the Gaeltacht (plural ). While the fluent Irish speakers of these areas, whose numbers have been estimated at 2030,000, are a minority of the total number of fluent Irish speakers, they represent a higher concentration of Irish speakers than other parts of the country and it is only in Gaeltacht areas that Irish continues to be spoken as a community vernacular to some extent.

According to data compiled by the Department of Tourism, Culture, Arts, Gaeltacht, Sport and Media, only 1/4 of households in Gaeltacht areas are fluent in Irish. The author of a detailed analysis of the survey, Donncha Ó hÉallaithe of the Galway-Mayo Institute of Technology, described the Irish language policy followed by Irish governments as a "complete and absolute disaster". The Irish Times, referring to his analysis published in the Irish language newspaper , quoted him as follows: "It is an absolute indictment of successive Irish Governments that at the foundation of the Irish State there were 250,000 fluent Irish speakers living in Irish-speaking or semi Irish-speaking areas, but the number now is between 20,000 and 30,000."

In the 1920s, when the Irish Free State was founded, Irish was still a vernacular in some western coastal areas. In the 1930s, areas where more than 25% of the population spoke Irish were classified as Gaeltacht. Today, the strongest Gaeltacht areas, numerically and socially, are those of South Connemara, the west of the Dingle Peninsula, and northwest Donegal, where many residents still use Irish as their primary language.

There are larger Gaeltacht regions in County Galway, including Connemara, the Aran Islands, Carraroe and Spiddal, on the west coast of County Donegal, and on the Dingle and Iveragh Peninsulas in County Kerry.

Smaller ones also exist in counties Mayo, Meath, Waterford, and Cork. Gweedore, County Donegal, is the largest Gaeltacht parish in Ireland. Irish language summer colleges in the Gaeltacht are attended by tens of thousands of teenagers annually. All aspects of Irish culture and tradition are encouraged.

Policy

Official Languages Act 2003 

The Act was passed 14 July 2003 with the main purpose of improving the amount and quality of public services delivered in Irish by the government and other public bodies. Compliance with the Act is monitored by the An Coimisinéir Teanga (Irish Language Commissioner) which was established in 2004 and any complaints or concerns pertaining to the Act are brought to them. There are 35 sections included in the Act all detailing different aspects of the use of Irish in official documentation and communication. Included in these sections are subjects such as Irish language use in official courts, official publications, and placenames. The Act was recently amended in December 2019 in order to strengthen the already preexisting legislation. All changes made took into account data collected from online surveys and written submissions.

Official Languages Scheme 2019–2022 
The Official Languages Scheme was enacted 1 July 2019 and is an 18-page document that adheres to the guidelines of the Official Languages Act 2003. The purpose of the Scheme is to provide services through the mediums of Irish and/or English. According to the Department of the Taoiseach, it is meant to "develop a sustainable economy and a successful society, to pursue Ireland's interests abroad, to implement the Government's Programme and to build a better future for Ireland and all her citizens."

20-Year Strategy for the Irish Language 2010–2030 

The Strategy was produced on 21 December 2010 and will stay in action until 2030; it aims to target language vitality and revitalization of the Irish language. The 30-page document published by the Government of Ireland details the objectives it plans to work towards in an attempt to preserve and promote both the Irish language and the Gaeltacht. It is divided into four separate phases with the intention of improving 9 main areas of action including:

 "Education"
 "The Gaeltacht"
 "Family Transmission of the Language - Early Intervention"
 "Administration, Services and Community"
 "Media and Technology"
 "Dictionaries"
 "Legislation and Status"
 "Economic Life"
 "Cross-cutting Initiatives"

The general goal for this strategy is to increase the amount of speakers from 83,000 to 250,000 by the end of its run.

Northern Ireland 

Before the partition of Ireland in 1921, Irish was recognised as a school subject and as "Celtic" in some third level institutions. Between 1921 and 1972, Northern Ireland had devolved government. During those years the political party holding power in the Stormont Parliament, the Ulster Unionist Party (UUP), was hostile to the language. The context of this hostility was the use of the language by nationalists. In broadcasting, there was an exclusion on the reporting of minority cultural issues, and Irish was excluded from radio and television for almost the first fifty years of the previous devolved government. After the 1998 Good Friday Agreement, the language gradually received a degree of formal recognition in Northern Ireland from the United Kingdom, and then, in 2003, by the British government's ratification in respect of the language of the European Charter for Regional or Minority Languages. In the 2006 St Andrews Agreement the British government promised to enact legislation to promote the language and in 2022 it approved legislation to recognise Irish as an official language alongside English. The bill received royal assent on 6 December 2022.

European Parliament 
Irish became an official language of the EU on 1 January 2007, meaning that MEPs with Irish fluency can now speak the language in the European Parliament and at committees, although in the case of the latter they have to give prior notice to a simultaneous interpreter in order to ensure that what they say can be interpreted into other languages.

While an official language of the European Union, only co-decision regulations were available until 2022, due to a five-year derogation, requested by the Irish Government when negotiating the language's new official status. The Irish government had committed itself to train the necessary number of translators and interpreters and to bear the related costs. This derogation ultimately came to an end on January 1, 2022, making Irish a fully recognised EU language for the first time in the state's history.

Before Irish became an official language it was afforded the status of treaty language and only the highest-level documents of the EU were made available in Irish.

Outside Ireland 

The Irish language was carried abroad in the modern period by a vast diaspora, chiefly to Great Britain and North America, but also to Australia, New Zealand and Argentina.
The first large movements began in the 17th century, largely as a result of the Cromwellian conquest of Ireland, which saw many Irish sent to the West Indies. Irish emigration to the United States was well established by the 18th century, and was reinforced in the 1840s by thousands fleeing from the Famine. This flight also affected Britain. Up until that time most emigrants spoke Irish as their first language, though English was establishing itself as the primary language. Irish speakers had first arrived in Australia in the late 18th century as convicts and soldiers, and many Irish-speaking settlers followed, particularly in the 1860s. New Zealand also received some of this influx. Argentina was the only non-English-speaking country to receive large numbers of Irish emigrants, and there were few Irish speakers among them.

Relatively few of the emigrants were literate in Irish, but manuscripts in the language were brought to both Australia and the United States, and it was in the United States that the first newspaper to make significant use of Irish was established: . In Australia, too, the language found its way into print. The Gaelic revival, which started in Ireland in the 1890s, found a response abroad, with branches of  being established in all the countries to which Irish speakers had emigrated.

The decline of Irish in Ireland and a slowing of emigration helped to ensure a decline in the language abroad, along with natural attrition in the host countries. Despite this, small groups of enthusiasts continued to learn and cultivate Irish in diaspora countries and elsewhere, a trend which strengthened in the second half of the 20th century. Today the language is taught at tertiary level in North America, Australia and Europe, and Irish speakers outside Ireland contribute to journalism and literature in the language. There are significant Irish-speaking networks in the United States and Canada; figures released for the period 2006–2008 show that 22,279 Irish Americans claimed to speak Irish at home.

The Irish language is also one of the languages of the Celtic League, a non-governmental organisation that promotes self-determination, Celtic identity and culture in Ireland, Scotland, Wales, Brittany, Cornwall and the Isle of Man, known collectively as the Celtic nations.

Irish was spoken as a community language until the early 20th century on the island of Newfoundland, in a form known as Newfoundland Irish. Certain Irish vocabulary, grammar, and pronunciation features are still used in modern Newfoundland English.

Usage 
The 2016 census data shows:The total number of people who answered 'yes' to being able to speak Irish in April 2016 was 1,761,420, a slight decrease (0.7 per cent) on the 2011 figure of 1,774,437. This represents 39.8 per cent of respondents compared with 41.4 in 2011... Of the 73,803 daily Irish speakers (outside the education system), 20,586 (27.9%) lived in Gaeltacht areas.

Daily Irish speakers in Gaeltacht areas between 2011 and 2016 

In 1996, the 3 electoral divisions in the State where Irish had the most daily speakers were An Turloch (91%+), Scainimh (89%+), Min an Chladaigh (88%+).

Dialects
Irish is represented by several traditional dialects and by various varieties of "urban" Irish. The latter have acquired lives of their own and a growing number of native speakers. Differences between the dialects make themselves felt in stress, intonation, vocabulary and structural features.

Roughly speaking, the three major dialect areas which survive coincide roughly with the provinces of Connacht, Munster and Ulster. Records of some dialects of Leinster were made by the Irish Folklore Commission and others. Newfoundland, in eastern Canada, had a form of Irish derived from the Munster Irish of the later 18th century (see Newfoundland Irish).

Connacht 

Historically, Connacht Irish represents the westernmost remnant of a dialect area which once stretched from east to west across the centre of Ireland. The strongest dialect of Connacht Irish is to be found in Connemara and the Aran Islands. Much closer to the larger Connacht Gaeltacht is the dialect spoken in the smaller region on the border between Galway and Mayo. There are a number of differences between the popular South Connemara form of Irish, the Mid-Connacht/Joyce Country form (on the border between Mayo and Galway) and the Achill and Erris forms in the north of the province.

The non-standard pronunciation of the  area with lengthened vowels and heavily reduced endings gives it a distinct sound.

As in Munster Irish, some short vowels are lengthened and others diphthongised before , in monosyllabic words and in the stressed syllable of multisyllabic words where the syllable is followed by a consonant. This can be seen in   "head",   "crooked",   "short",   "sledgehammer",   "foreigner, non-Gael",   "a wonder, a marvel", etc. The form , when occurring at the end of words like '', tends to be pronounced as [iː].

All these pronunciations are distinctively regional.

The northern Mayo dialect of Erris and Achill is in grammar and morphology essentially a Connacht dialect but shows some similarities to Ulster Irish due to large-scale immigration of dispossessed people following the Plantation of Ulster.

Irish President Douglas Hyde was possibly one of the last speakers of the Roscommon dialect of Irish.

Munster 

Munster Irish is the dialect spoken in the Gaeltacht areas of the counties of Cork, Kerry, and Waterford. Of the three counties, the Irish spoken in Cork and Kerry is quite similar while that of Waterford is more distinct.

Some typical features of Munster Irish are:

 The use of synthetic verbs in parallel with a pronominal subject system, thus "I must" is / in Munster, while other dialects prefer  ( means "I"). "I was and you were" is / in Munster but more commonly  in other dialects. Note that these are strong tendencies, and the personal forms bhíos etc. are used in the West and North, particularly when the words are last in the clause.
 Use of independent/dependent forms of verbs that are not included in the Standard. Similarly, the traditional form preserved in Munster  "I give"/ is / in the Standard;  I get/ is /.
 When before  and so on, in monosyllabic words and in the stressed syllable of multisyllabic words where the syllable is followed by a consonant, some short vowels are lengthened while others are diphthongised, in   "head",   "crooked",   "short",   "sledgehammer",   "foreigner, non-Gael",   "a wonder, a marvel",   "companion, mate", etc.
 A copular construction involving  "it" is frequently used. In effect the construction is a type of "fronting".
 Both masculine and feminine words are subject to lenition after  (/) "in the",  "of the" and  "to/for the" : , "in the shop", compared to the Standard  (the Standard lenites only feminine nouns in the dative in these cases).
 Stress is generally on the second syllable of a word when the first syllable contains a short vowel, and the second syllable contains a long vowel or diphthong, or is -, e.g.  is pronounced [ciəˈɾˠaːn̪ˠ] opposed to [ˈciəɾˠaːn̪ˠ] in Connacht and Ulster.

Ulster 

Ulster Irish is the dialect spoken in the Gaeltacht regions of Donegal. These regions contain all of Ulster's communities where Irish has been spoken in an unbroken line back to when the language was the dominant language of Ireland. The Irish-speaking communities in other parts of Ulster are a result of language revival – English-speaking families deciding to learn Irish. Census data shows that 4,130 people speak it at home.

Linguistically, the most important of the Ulster dialects today is that which is spoken, with slight differences, in both Gweedore ( = Inlet of Streaming Water) and The Rosses.

Ulster Irish sounds quite different from the other two main dialects. It shares several features with southern dialects of Scottish Gaelic and Manx, as well as having many characteristic words and shades of meanings. However, since the demise of those Irish dialects spoken natively in what is today Northern Ireland, it is probably an exaggeration to see present-day Ulster Irish as an intermediary form between Scottish Gaelic and the southern and western dialects of Irish. Northern Scottish Gaelic has many non-Ulster features in common with Munster Irish.

One noticeable trait of Ulster Irish, Scots Gaelic and Manx is the use of the negative particle  in place of the Munster and Connacht . Though southern Donegal Irish tends to use  more than cha(n), cha(n) has almost ousted  in northernmost dialects (e.g.

Leinster 
Down to the early 19th century and even later, Irish was spoken in all twelve counties of Leinster. The evidence furnished by placenames, literary sources and recorded speech indicates that there was no Leinster dialect as such. Instead, the main dialect used in the province was represented by a broad central belt stretching from west Connacht eastwards to the Liffey estuary and southwards to Wexford, though with many local variations. Two smaller dialects were represented by the Ulster speech of counties Meath and Louth, which extended as far south as the Boyne valley, and a Munster dialect found in Kilkenny and south Laois.

The main dialect had characteristics which survive today only in the Irish of Connacht. The word  (hill) would therefore be pronounced . Examples are the placenames Crooksling in County Dublin and Crukeen in Carlow.

Early evidence regarding colloquial Irish in east Leinster is found in The Fyrst Boke of the Introduction of Knowledge (1547), by the English physician and traveller Andrew Borde. The illustrative phrases he uses include the following:

The Pale 

The Pale was an area around late medieval Dublin under the control of the English government. By the late 15th century it consisted of an area along the coast from Dalkey, south of Dublin, to the garrison town of Dundalk, with an inland boundary encompassing Naas and Leixlip in the Earldom of Kildare and Trim and Kells in County Meath to the north. In this area of "Englyshe tunge" English had never actually been a dominant language – and was moreover a relatively late comer; the first colonisers were Normans who spoke Norman French, and before these Norse. The Irish language had always been the language of the bulk of the population. An English official remarked of the Pale in 1515 that "all the common people of the said half counties that obeyeth the King's laws, for the most part be of Irish birth, of Irish habit and of Irish language".

With the strengthening of English cultural and political control, language change began to occur but this did not become clearly evident until the 18th century. Even then, in the decennial period 1771–81, the percentage of Irish speakers in Meath was at least 41%. By 1851 this had fallen to less than 3%.

General decline 
English expanded strongly in Leinster in the 18th century but Irish speakers were still numerous. In the decennial period 1771–81 certain counties had estimated percentages of Irish speakers as follows (though the estimates are likely to be too low):

Kilkenny 57%
Louth 57%
Longford 22%
Westmeath 17%

The language saw its most rapid initial decline in counties Dublin, Kildare, Laois, Wexford, and Wicklow. In recent years, County Wicklow has been noted as having the lowest percentage of Irish speakers of any county in Ireland, with only 0.14% of its population claiming to have passable knowledge of the language. The proportion of Irish-speaking children in Leinster went down as follows: 17% in the 1700s, 11% in the 1800s, 3% in the 1830s, and virtually none in the 1860s. The Irish census of 1851 showed that there were still a number of older speakers in County Dublin. Sound recordings were made between 1928 and 1931 of some of the last speakers in Omeath, County Louth (now available in digital form). The last known traditional native speaker in Omeath, and in Leinster as a whole, was Annie O'Hanlon (née Dobbin), who died in 1960. Her dialect was, in fact, a branch of the Irish of south-east Ulster.

Urban use from the middle ages to the 19th century 
Irish was spoken as a community language in Irish towns and cities down to the 19th century. In the 16th and 17th centuries it was widespread even in Dublin and the Pale. The English administrator William Gerard (1518–1581) commented as follows: "All English, and the most part with delight, even in Dublin, speak Irish," while the Old English historian Richard Stanihurst (1547–1618) lamented that "When their posterity became not altogether so wary in keeping, as their ancestors were valiant in conquering, the Irish language was free dennized in the English Pale: this canker took such deep root, as the body that before was whole and sound, was by little and little festered, and in manner wholly putrified".

The Irish of Dublin, situated as it was between the east Ulster dialect of Meath and Louth to the north and the Leinster-Connacht dialect further south, may have reflected the characteristics of both in phonology and grammar. In County Dublin itself the general rule was to place the stress on the initial vowel of words. With time it appears that the forms of the dative case took over the other case endings in the plural (a tendency found to a lesser extent in other dialects).

English authorities of the Cromwellian period, aware that Irish was widely spoken in Dublin, arranged for its official use. In 1655 several local dignitaries were ordered to oversee a lecture in Irish to be given in Dublin. In March 1656 a converted Catholic priest, Séamas Corcy, was appointed to preach in Irish at Bride's parish every Sunday, and was also ordered to preach at Drogheda and Athy. In 1657 the English colonists in Dublin presented a petition to the Municipal Council complaining that in Dublin itself "there is Irish commonly and usually spoken".

There is contemporary evidence of the use of Irish in other urban areas at the time. In 1657 it was found necessary to have an Oath of Abjuration (rejecting the authority of the Pope) read in Irish in Cork so that people could understand it.

Irish was sufficiently strong in early 18th century Dublin to be the language of a coterie of poets and scribes led by Seán and Tadhg Ó Neachtain, both poets of note. Scribal activity in Irish persisted in Dublin right through the 18th century. An outstanding example was Muiris Ó Gormáin (Maurice Gorman), a prolific producer of manuscripts who advertised his services (in English) in Faulkner's Dublin Journal. There were still an appreciable number of Irish speakers in County Dublin at the time of the 1851 census.

In other urban centres the descendants of medieval Anglo-Norman settlers, the so-called Old English, were Irish-speaking or bilingual by the 16th century. The English administrator and traveller Fynes Moryson, writing in the last years of the 16th century, said that "the English Irish and the very citizens (excepting those of Dublin where the lord deputy resides) though they could speak English as well as we, yet commonly speak Irish among themselves, and were hardly induced by our familiar conversation to speak English with us". In Galway, a city dominated by Old English merchants and loyal to the Crown up to the Irish Confederate Wars (1641–1653), the use of the Irish language had already provoked the passing of an Act of Henry VIII (1536), ordaining as follows:

Item, that every inhabitant within oure said towne [Galway] endeavour themselfes to speake English, and to use themselfes after the English facon; and, speciallye, that you, and every one of you, doe put your children to scole, to lerne to speke English...

The demise of native cultural institutions in the seventeenth century saw the social prestige of Irish diminish, and the gradual Anglicisation of the middle classes followed. The census of 1851 showed, however, that the towns and cities of Munster still had significant Irish-speaking populations. Much earlier, in 1819, James McQuige, a veteran Methodist lay preacher in Irish, wrote: "In some of the largest southern towns, Cork, Kinsale and even the Protestant town of Bandon, provisions are sold in the markets, and cried in the streets, in Irish". Irish speakers constituted over 40% of the population of Cork even in 1851.

Modern urban usage 
The late 18th and 19th centuries saw a reduction in the number of Dublin's Irish speakers, in keeping with the trend elsewhere. By the 1930s Dublin had a lively literary life in Irish.

As of 2019 there are 37 such primary schools in Dublin alone.

It has been suggested that Ireland's towns and cities are acquiring a critical mass of Irish speakers, reflected in the expansion of Irish language media. Many are younger speakers who, after encountering Irish at school, made an effort to acquire fluency, while others have been educated through Irish and some have been raised with Irish.

It has been suggested that the comparative standard is still the Irish of the Gaeltacht, but other evidence suggests that young urban speakers take pride in having their own distinctive variety of the language. A comparison of traditional Irish and urban Irish shows that the distinction between broad and slender consonants, which is fundamental to Irish phonology and grammar, is not fully or consistently observed in urban Irish. This and other changes make it possible that urban Irish will become a new dialect or even, over a long period, develop into a creole (i.e. a new language) distinct from Gaeltacht Irish. It has also been argued that there is a certain elitism among Irish speakers, with most respect being given to the Irish of native Gaeltacht speakers and with "Dublin" (i.e. urban) Irish being under-represented in the media. This, however, is paralleled by a failure among some urban Irish speakers to acknowledge grammatical and phonological features essential to the structure of the language.

Standardisation 

There is no single official standard for pronouncing the Irish language. Online dictionaries such as Foclóir Béarla-Gaeilge provide audio files in the three major dialects. The differences between dialects are considerable, and have led to recurrent difficulties in conceptualising a "standard Irish." In recent decades contacts between speakers of different dialects have become more frequent and the differences between the dialects are less noticeable.

Its rules are followed by most schools in Ireland, though schools in and near Irish-speaking regions also use the local dialect.

Phonology 

In pronunciation, Irish most closely resembles its nearest relatives, Scottish Gaelic and Manx. One notable feature is that consonants (except ) come in pairs, one "broad" (velarised, pronounced with the back of the tongue pulled back towards the soft palate) and one "slender" (palatalised, pronounced with the middle of the tongue pushed up towards the hard palate). While broad–slender pairs are not unique to Irish (being found, for example, in Russian), in Irish they have a grammatical function.

Diphthongs: .

Syntax and morphology

Irish is a fusional, VSO, nominative-accusative language. Irish is neither verb nor satellite framed, and makes liberal use of deictic verbs.

Nouns decline for 3 numbers: singular, dual (only in conjunction with the number  "two"), plural; 2 genders: masculine, feminine; and 4 cases: nomino-accusative, vocative, genitive, and prepositional-locative, with fossilised traces of the older accusative. Adjectives agree with nouns in number, gender, and case. Adjectives generally follow nouns, though some precede or prefix nouns. Demonstrative adjectives have proximal, medial, and distal forms. The prepositional-locative case is called the dative by convention, though it originates in the Proto-Celtic ablative.

Verbs conjugate for 3 tenses: past, present, future; 2 aspects: perfective, imperfective; 2 numbers: singular, plural; 4 moods: indicative, subjunctive, conditional, imperative; 2 relative forms, the present and future relative; and in some verbs, independent and dependent forms. Verbs conjugate for 3 persons and an impersonal form which is actor-free; the 3rd person singular acts as a person-free personal form that can be followed or otherwise refer to any person or number.

There are two verbs for "to be", one for inherent qualities with only two forms,  "present" and  "past" and "conditional", and one for transient qualities, with a full complement of forms except for the verbal adjective. The two verbs share the one verbal noun.

Irish verb formation employs a mixed system during conjugation, with both analytic and synthetic methods employed depending on tense, number, mood and person. For example, in the official standard, present tense verbs have conjugated forms only in the 1st person and autonomous forms (ie.  'I praise',  'we praise',  'is praised, one praises' ), whereas all other persons are conveyed analytically (ie.  'he praises',  'you  praise'). The ratio of analytic to synthetic forms in a given verb paradigm varies between the various tenses and moods. The conditional, imperative and past habitual forms prefer synthetic forms in most persons and numbers, whereas the subjunctive, past, future and present forms prefer mostly analytical forms. 

The meaning of the passive voice is largely conveyed through the autonomous verb form, however there also exist other structures analogous to the passival and resultative constructions. There are also a number of preverbal particles marking the negative, interrogative, subjunctive, relative clauses, etc. There is a verbal noun and verbal adjective. Verb forms are highly regular, many grammars recognise only 11 irregular verbs.

Prepositions inflect for person and number. Different prepositions govern different cases. In Old and Middle Irish,
prepositions governed different cases depending on intended semantics; this has disappeared in Modern Irish except in fossilised form.

Irish has no verb to express having; instead, the word  ("at", etc.) is used in conjunction with the transient "be" verb :

 "I have a book." (Literally, "there is a book at me," cf. Russian У меня есть книга, Finnish minulla on kirja, French le livre est à moi)
 "You (singular) have a book."
 "He has a book."
 "She has a book."
 "We have a book."
 "You (plural) have a book."
 "They have a book."

Numerals have 3 forms: abstract, general and ordinal. The numbers from 2 to 10 (and these in combination with higher numbers) are rarely used for people, numeral nominals being used instead:

 "Two."
 "Two books."
 "Two people, a couple",  "Two men",  "Two women".
,  (free variation) "Second."

Irish has both decimal and vigesimal systems:

10: 

20: 

30: vigesimal – ; decimal – 

40: v. ; d. 

50: v. ; d.  (also:  "half-hundred")

60: v. ; d. 

70: v. ; d. 

80: v. ; d. 

90: v. ; d. 

100: v. ; d. 

A number such as 35 has various forms:

 "15 and 20"

 "5 and 30"

 "15 on 20"

 "5 on 30"

 "15 of 20 (genitive)"

 "5 of 30 (genitive)"

 "20 and 15"

 "30 and 5"

The latter is most commonly used in mathematics.

Initial mutations

In Irish, there are two classes of initial consonant mutations, which express grammatical relationship and meaning in verbs, nouns and adjectives:

 Lenition describes the change of stops into fricatives.
  "throw!" –  "I threw" (lenition as a past-tense marker, caused by the particle , now generally omitted)
  "requirement" –  "lack of the requirement" (lenition marking the genitive case of a masculine noun)
  "John" –  "John!"
 Eclipsis covers the voicing of voiceless stops, and nasalisation of voiced stops.
  "Father" –  "our Father"
  "start",  "at the start"
  "Galway" –  "in Galway"

Mutations are often the only way to distinguish grammatical forms. For example, the only non-contextual way to distinguish possessive pronouns "her," "his" and "their", is through initial mutations since all meanings are represented by the same word .

 his shoe –  (lenition)
 their shoe –  (eclipsis)
 her shoe –  (unchanged)

Due to initial mutation, prefixes, clitics, suffixes, root inflection, ending morphology, elision, sandhi, epenthesis, and assimilation; the beginning, core, and end of words can each change radically and even simultaneously depending on context.

Orthography

Ogham was the writing system used to write Primitive Irish and Old Irish until Latin script was introduced in the 5th century CE. The main typeface used to write Irish was Gaelic type until it was replaced by Roman type in the mid-20th century.

The traditional Irish alphabet consists of 18 letters: . It does not contain , although they are used in modern loanwords.  occurs in a small number of (mainly onomatopoeic) native words and colloquialisms. 

Vowels may be accented with an acute accent (Irish and Hiberno-English:  "long (sign)"), but it is ignored for purposes of alphabetisation.

The overdot ( "dot of lenition",  "struck", or  "lenition") was used in traditional orthography to indicated lenition, An Caighdeán uses a following  for this purpose. The use of Gaelic type and the overdot today is restricted to when a traditional style is consciously being used, e.g. the Irish Defence Forces cap badge (see above). Extending the use of the overdot to Roman type would theoretically have the advantage of making Irish texts significantly shorter, e.g. "you (pl.) will get" would become . Letters with an overdot are available in Unicode and Latin-8 character sets.

Spelling reform 
This de facto standard was subsequently approved by the State and developed into , which simplified and standardised the orthography and grammar by removing inter-dialectal silent letters and simplifying vowel combinations. Where multiple versions existed in different dialects for the same word, one or more were selected, for example:
  → , "Louth" (see County Louth Historic Names)
  → , "food"
  → , "Irish language"

 does not reflect all dialects to the same degree, e.g. "food" (genitive , pronounced  in Munster, reflecting the pre-Caighdeán spelling because - fortiate to - in Munster pronunciation). Another example would be  "hard", pronounced  in Munster, in line with the pre-Caighdeán spelling, .

Sample text 

Article 1 of the Universal Declaration of Human Rights

See also 

 , Anglicisms in Irish
 , a course in basic spoken Irish 
 Comparison of Scottish Gaelic and Irish
 , Irish language Society
 Dictionary of the Irish Language
 Goidelic substrate hypothesis
 Hiberno-Latin, a variety of Medieval Latin used in Irish monasteries. It included Greek, Hebrew and Celtic neologisms.
 Irish language outside Ireland
 Irish name and Place names in Ireland
 Irish words used in the English language
 Irish, a subject of the Junior Cycle examination in Secondary schools in Ireland
 List of artists who have released Irish-language songs
 List of English words of Irish origin
 List of Ireland-related topics
 List of Irish-language given names
 List of Irish-language media
 Modern literature in Irish
 Status of the Irish language, a detailed account of the current state of the language.

Notes

References

Citations

Bibliography 

 Caerwyn Williams, J.E. & Ní Mhuiríosa, Máirín (ed.). . An Clóchomhar Tta 1979.
 McCabe, Richard A.. Spenser's Monstrous Regiment: Elizabethan Ireland and the Poetics of Difference. Oxford University Press 2002. .
 Hickey, Raymond. The Dialects of Irish: Study of a Changing Landscape. Walter de Gruyter, 2011. .
 Hickey, Raymond. The Sound Structure of Modern Irish. De Gruyter Mouton 2014. .
 De Brún, Pádraig. Scriptural Instruction in the Vernacular: The Irish Society and its Teachers 1818–1827. Dublin Institute for Advanced Studies 2009. 
 Doyle, Aidan, A History of the Irish Language: From the Norman Invasion to Independence, Oxford, 2015. 
 Fitzgerald, Garrett, 'Estimates for baronies of minimal level of Irish-speaking amongst successive decennial cohorts, 117–1781 to 1861–1871,’ Volume 84, Proceedings of the Royal Irish Academy 1984.
 Garvin, Tom, Preventing the Future: Why was Ireland so poor for so long?, Gill and MacMillan, 2005. 
 Hindley, Reg (1991, new ed.). The Death of the Irish Language: A Qualified Obituary. Routledge. 
 McMahon, Timothy G.. Grand Opportunity: The Gaelic Revival and Irish Society, 1893–1910. Syracuse University Press 2008. 
 Ó Gráda, Cormac. '' in Dublin Review of Books, Issue 34, 6 May 2013: 
 Kelly, James & Mac Murchaidh, Ciarán (eds.). Irish and English: Essays on the Linguistic and Cultural Frontier 1600–1900. Four Courts Press 2012. 
 Ní Mhunghaile, Lesa. 'An Eighteenth Century Irish scribe's private library: Muiris Ó Gormáin's books' in Proceedings of the Royal Irish Academy, Volume 110C, 2010, pp. 239–276.
Seán Ó Mórdha.  1981.
 Ó hÓgáin, Dáithí. Labhrann Laighnigh: Téacsanna agus Cainteanna ó Shean-Chúige Laighean. Coiscéim 2011.
 Ó Laoire, Muiris. Language Use and Language Attitudes in Ireland' in Multilingualism in European Bilingual Contexts : Language Use and Attitudes, ed. David Lasagabaster and Ángel Huguet. Multilingual Matters Ltd. 2007. 
 Shibakov, Alexey. Irish Word Forms / Irische Wortformen. epubli 2017. 
 Williams, Nicholas. Kim McCone and others. Maigh Nuad 1994. 

 External links 

 Discover Irish
 "Learning Irish?," BBC''
  programmes
 Irish Swadesh list of basic vocabulary words (from Wiktionary's Swadesh-list appendix)

Grammar and pronunciation 
 Learn Irish Grammar with audio and pronunciation
  Magazine – Irish Gaelic Arts, Culture, And History Alive Worldwide Today
 Trinity College Dublin The Irish Language Synthesiser

Dictionaries 
  – Dictionaries and terminology resource
 General Gaelic Dictionaries

 
Languages attested from the 4th century
Fusional languages
Goidelic languages
Languages of Northern Ireland
Languages of Ireland
Verb–subject–object languages
Vertical vowel systems
Languages of the Republic of Ireland